Love, etc is a novel by Julian Barnes published in 2000, although it is also the title of a French film based on his earlier novel Talking it Over.

Plot
Love, etc was written some ten years after Talking it Over and is set ten years later. In the intervening period Stuart, the protagonist,  has emigrated to America, remarried, opened a restaurant, got divorced and returned to England, where he has set up a successful organic food  business. Meanwhile, Oliver and Gillian and their two daughters live in a small flat in north-east London, Oliver still seeks success as a writer supported by Gillian's picture restoration. Stuart appears to have forgiven Oliver for stealing his wife and offers him a job as a driver...

References

External links
The Complete Review (containing links to reviews in The Guardian, The Observer and The New York Times and quotes from many others)
Julian Barnes Website: Love, etc

Novels by Julian Barnes
2000 British novels
Sequel novels
Jonathan Cape books
Novels with multiple narrators